Augustine Thomas O'Donnell, Baron O'Donnell,  (born 1 October 1952) is a former British senior civil servant and economist, who between 2005 and 2011 (under three Prime Ministers) served as the Cabinet Secretary, the highest official in the British Civil Service.

O'Donnell announced after the 2010 General Election that he would step down within that Parliament and did so at the end of 2011. His post was then split into three positions: he was succeeded as Cabinet Secretary by Sir Jeremy Heywood, as Head of the Home Civil Service by Sir Bob Kerslake (in a part-time role), and as Permanent Secretary in the Cabinet Office by Ian Watmore. Whilst Cabinet Secretary, O'Donnell was regularly referred to within the Civil Service, and subsequently in the popular press, as GOD; this was mainly because of his initials. In 2012, O'Donnell joined Frontier Economics as a senior advisor.

Background
O'Donnell was born and raised in south London. Educated at Salesian College, Battersea, he read Economics at the University of Warwick before taking his MPhil degree at Nuffield College, Oxford. He was a lecturer at the University of Glasgow in the Political Economy Department from 1975 until 1979, when he joined the Treasury as an economist.

In 1985, he joined the British Embassy in Washington, serving as the First Secretary of the Economics division for four years. In 1989 O'Donnell became press secretary for the Chancellor of the Exchequer before transferring next door to serve as press secretary to the prime minister from 1990 to 1994.

From 1997 to 1998, O'Donnell was the United Kingdom's Executive Director to both the International Monetary Fund and the World Bank, again in Washington, before returning to HM Treasury to serve as both Director of Macroeconomic Policy and Prospects and also Head of the Government Economics Service, with overall responsibility for the professional economists in Her Majesty's Government. A year later, in 1999, he was appointed Managing Director of Macroeconomic Policy and International Finance, with responsibility for Fiscal Policy, International Development, and European Union Economic and Monetary Union.

Cabinet Secretary and Head of the Civil Service
On 8 July 2002, O'Donnell took over from Sir Andrew Turnbull as Permanent Secretary of the Treasury following the appointment of Sir Andrew as Cabinet Secretary. Three years later, on 15 June 2005, it was announced that O'Donnell would again replace Turnbull, this time as Cabinet Secretary, on the latter's imminent retirement. He took up office in August 2005.

O'Donnell is known for his "wondrous interpersonal gifts" and his informal style. He regularly visited Civil Service departments outside London "to meet civil servants at work".

During his time as Cabinet Secretary, his authority was seen as absolute, giving rise to the affectionate nickname "GOD" based on his initials as they appeared in Government papers.

The annual remuneration for this position was £235,000.

In his role as Cabinet Secretary, O'Donnell was responsible for overseeing the review of Christopher Meyer's controversial memoirs, DC Confidential, in November 2005. The previous month he had told the Public Administration Select Committee that it was "wrong" for civil servants to publish personal memoirs.

Channel 4 News on 10 August 2010 had reported that O'Donnell would leave his post before the end of the current Parliament.

In January 2011, it emerged that O'Donnell had decided not to publish correspondence sent between Tony Blair and George W Bush prior to the 2003 invasion. The papers were, however, provided to the Iraq Inquiry itself. His reasoning is explained in several documents between himself and Sir John Chilcot.

In November 2010, O'Donnell published a draft copy of the Cabinet manual. This document outlines the laws, rules and conventions that apply to the British executive.

On 11 October 2011, it was announced by Downing Street that O'Donnell was to retire at the end of the year. His successor was announced as the Downing Street Permanent Secretary Jeremy Heywood. However the roles of Cabinet Secretary, Head of the Civil Service and Permanent Secretary at the Cabinet Office were split.

On 22 December 2011, O'Donnell said that the future of the Union is one of several "enormous challenges" facing the political establishment in the coming years. The admission from such a senior non-political figure that the break-up of Britain is now a real possibility is likely to push the issue up the political agenda. "Over the next few years there will be enormous challenges, such as whether to keep our kingdom united," he warns officials and politicians.

Post-Cabinet Secretary
In addition to being the chair of Frontier Economics, O'Donnell is also visiting professor to the London School of Economics and University College London.

He is also a trustee of the Economist Group.

He is a strategic adviser to the chief executive of Toronto Dominion Bank, a fellow of the Institute for Government
and was the chairman of the Commission on Wellbeing at the Legatum Institute.

In 2015, he was co-author of the report that launched the Global Apollo Programme, which calls for developed nations to commit to spending 0.02% of their GDP for 10 years, to fund co-ordinated research to make carbon-free baseload electricity less costly than electricity from coal by 2025.

Wellbeing movement
O'Donnell has been a leader in the wellbeing and happiness movements. He chaired the development group of founding partners setting up the What Works Centre for Wellbeing. He is a supporter of Action for Happiness, and has spoken at the University of Oxford Wellbeing Research Centre's Wellbeing Research & Policy Conference.

Peerage
On 10 January 2012, O'Donnell was created a life peer as Baron O'Donnell, of Clapham in the London Borough of Wandsworth, and was introduced in the House of Lords, where he sits as a crossbencher, on 12 January 2012. In his first speech in the House of Lords, in June 2012, O'Donnell warned that too many Treasury officials were leaving, that staff are underpaid, and that the Treasury may be struggling to address the problems caused by the ongoing global financial turmoil.

Political views
O'Donnell supports a liberal immigration policy, saying in 2011 that "[w]hen I was at the Treasury I argued for the most open door possible to immigration … I think it’s my job to maximise global welfare not national welfare." O'Donnell has repeated this view in a milder form in newspaper articles, and thinks that his views about immigration are in the interests of the average British person, notwithstanding some short-term losers.

In July 2017 he warned that "there was no way Brexit would happen smoothly."

Personal interests
Lord O'Donnell is a keen sportsman, having played football for the University of Warwick First XI and for Oxford, earning two Blues in 1973/4 and 1974/5. While Permanent Secretary at the Treasury he won a football medal at the annual Civil Service Sports Day—the first Permanent Secretary to do so. O'Donnell has played for the Mandarins Cricket Club for many years, the third Cabinet Secretary to do so (the others being Sir Robin Butler and Sir Andrew Turnbull). He is a keen supporter of Manchester United.

In 2010, The Tablet named him as one of Britain's most influential Roman Catholics.

O'Donnell was formerly a governor of his alma mater, Salesian College, Battersea.

Honours
O'Donnell has received several appointments to the Most Honourable Order of the Bath: he was appointed Companion (CB) in the 1994 New Year Honours, Knight Commander (KCB) in the 2005 Birthday Honours and Knight Grand Cross (GCB) in the 2011 Birthday Honours. The Parliamentary Public Administration Committee cited the example of at least one of O'Donnell's appointments (his knighthood) to the Order as automatic honours granted due to his position and not for exceptional service, although it is not specified if all of his honours were granted solely due to his position or if some were due to exceptional service.

In 2014, O'Donnell was elected an Honorary Fellow of the British Academy. In 2016, he was elected a Fellow of the Academy of Social Sciences (FAcSS).

References

External links
 The Guardian article on O'Donnell becoming Cabinet Secretary
 BBC News background profile article on O'Donnell on his attaining Permanent Secretaryship
 BBC News background profile article on his attaining Cabinet Secretaryship
 Cabinet Office biography

|-

|-

|-

|-

|-

1952 births
21st-century Roman Catholics
Alumni of Nuffield College, Oxford
Alumni of the University of Glasgow
Alumni of the University of Warwick
British people of Irish descent
British Roman Catholics
Crossbench life peers
Knights Grand Cross of the Order of the Bath
Living people
Members of HM Government Economic Service
Civil servants from London
Press secretaries
Permanent Secretaries of HM Treasury
Private secretaries in the British Civil Service
Cabinet Secretaries (United Kingdom)
Global Apollo Programme
Fellows of the Academy of Social Sciences
Honorary Fellows of the British Academy
Life peers created by Elizabeth II